The name 'Caren' derives from Welsh; Car 'Love' & en 'one', meaning; 'to love' or 'the one who loves'  
The pronunciation is similar to Karen, but there is little integration. The actual pronunciation is close to Kah-ren.

Given name
 Caren Bohan, American journalist
 Caren Chammas (born 1993), Lebanese judoka
 Caren Gussoff (born 1973), American author
 Caren Jungjohann (born 1970), German field hockey player
 Caren Kaplan, American professor
 Caren Kaye (born 1951), American actress
 Caren Kemner (born 1965), American volleyball player
 Caren Lissner (born 1973), American editor
 Caren Merrick, American entrepreneur
 Caren Metschuck (born 1963), German swimmer
 Caren Marsh Doll (born 1919), American actress
 Caren Miosga (born 1969), German journalist and television presenter
 Caren Pistorius (born 1985), South African-New Zealand actress
 Caren Sonn (born 1968), hurdler
 Caren Lyn Tackett (born 1976), American actress
 Caren Z. Turner, American political consultant
 Caren K.Nyabuto, (born 1995) Kenyan,

Surname
 Jonathan Caren, British playwright and television writer
 Mike Caren (born 1977), American record producer
 Romana Carén (born 1979), Austrian actress
 Joseph Carens, Canadian professor

Fictional characters
 Caren, a supporting character from Mermaid Melody Pichi Pichi Pitch
 Caren Ortensia, a character from Fate/hollow ataraxia
 Caren Velázquez, a character in Dino Crisis 3

See also
 Karen (name), including a list of people with the name

References